The mealy amazon has been split into the following species:
 Southern mealy amazon, Amazona farinosa
 Northern mealy amazon, Amazona guatemalae

Birds by common name